The Zenica prison (Kazneno-popravni zavod zatvorenog tipa Zenica, KPZ Zenica, K.P. DOM, Zenička kaznionica) is a closed-type prison located in Zenica, Bosnia and Herzegovina. It was opened in 1886. It was the largest prison in Yugoslavia during its existence, and is currently the largest prison in Bosnia and Herzegovina.

As of 2016, the prison had a capacity of 813 inmates.

Inmates

Austria-Hungary (1886–1918)
Ivo Andrić – Nobel Prize for Literature winner
Gavrilo Princip, Nedeljko Čabrinović, Muhamed Mehmedbašić, Vaso Čubrilović – collaborators in the assassination of Archduke Franz Ferdinand of Austria

SFR Yugoslavia (1945–1992)
Petar Čule – Catholic bishop
Varnava Nastić – Serbian Orthodox bishop and saint
Vojislav Šešelj – Serbian politician
Alija Izetbegović – Bosnian politician

Yugoslav wars and today
Jackie Arklöv – a Swedish neo-Nazi mercenary who fought for the Croatian Defence Council; spent one year of eight-year sentence for war crimes at the Zenica prison before being released to Sweden
Jerko Ivanković Lijanović – Bosnian politician and businessman sentenced to seven years for abuse of office (asof-since )

In popular culture
 KPD Zenica prison is mentioned in a song "Zenica blues" by Bosnian band Zabranjeno pušenje.
 KPD Zenica prison is mentioned in a song "K.P. Dom" by Bosnian Band Dubioza Kolektiv.
 KPD Zenica prison is mentioned in a song "Zenica" by Bosnian singer DJ Krmak (Crmac).
 KPD Zenica prison is mentioned in a song "KPD Zenica" by Bosnian root music group Raspjevane Meraklije

References

External links

Prisons in Bosnia and Herzegovina
1886 establishments in Austria-Hungary